Kudumba Vaarthakal is a 1998 Indian Malayalam-language comedy film directed by Ali Akbar and produced by Milan Jaleel. The film stars Jagadish, Jagathy Sreekumar, Innocent, Kalabhavan Mani and Kalpana in the lead roles. The film has musical score by Berny-Ignatius. Songs are written by S. Ramesan Nair

Plot

Cast
 Jagadish as Devadas
 Rehana Navas as Parvathy Nair
 Jagathy Sreekumar as Govindan
 Innocent as Ambu Nair/Devadas
 Kalabhavan Mani as Lonayi 
 Kalpana as Meera Govindan
 Manka Mahesh as Pathmakshi
 Sadiq as Narendran
 Salim Kumar as Kunjumon
 Adoor Pankajam as Nani Amma

Soundtrack
The music was composed by Berny-Ignatius and the lyrics were written by S. Ramesan Nair.

References

External links
 

1998 films
1990s Malayalam-language films